State Route 564 (SR 564) is an east–west highway in Clark County, Nevada, in the southeast portion of the Las Vegas Valley. The route travels through the city of Henderson, traveling from the junction of Interstate 215 (I-215) and I-11 south and I-515 north, also part of U.S. Route 93 (US 93) and US 95, to Lake Las Vegas, ending near Lake Mead. The route was designated in 2002, replacing a portion of SR 146.

Route description

State Route 564 begins as a continuation of the Las Vegas Beltway, starting where I-215 ends at its junction with I-11 and I-515, which are concurrent with US 93 and US 95. From there, the route travels east along Lake Mead Parkway, a major arterial roadway, towards downtown Henderson and intersects the Boulder Highway (SR 582). SR 564 continues northeast through Henderson's residential neighborhoods and turns east just west of Lake Mead National Recreation Area. SR 564 enters the park, at a point southeast of Lake Las Vegas, and terminates at the end of state maintenance, while the road continues east. Around 52,500 vehicles travel on the highway near its western terminus on average each day.

History
In the late 1970s, the highways in the state highway system were renumbered. SR 41 was split into two state routes. SR 146 started from I-15 to US 93/US 95 in Henderson. SR 147 started from US 93/US 95 to North Las Vegas. A limited access highway alignment from US 93/US 95 started construction in 1985–1986. An interchange was built for SR 146 in 1989–1990, and the highway was completed by 1995–1996. The designation I-515 was added to the highway. In the same period, SR 147's designation was removed from eastern section of Lake Mead Drive, and replaced by SR 146. As the Las Vegas Beltway (I-215) was being constructed in the late 1990s, the last  between Lake Mead Drive (now Saint Rose Parkway) and Interstate 515 were constructed on the SR 146 alignment. This left SR 146 in two separate segments. The eastern segment of SR 146 was reassigned to SR 564 by 2002. I-215 from SR 146 to SR 564's western terminus was completed in October 2005.

Major intersections

See also

References

External links 

 

564
Streets in Henderson, Nevada